The women's 100 metre backstroke competition of the swimming events at the 1971 Pan American Games took place on 7 August. The last Pan American Games champion was Elaine Tanner of Canada.

This race consisted of two lengths of the pool, all in backstroke.

Results
All times are in minutes and seconds.

Heats

Final 
The final was held on August 7.

References

Swimming at the 1971 Pan American Games
Pan